Seela Sing'isi is an administrative ward in the Meru District  of the Arusha Region of Tanzania. According to the 2012 census, the ward has a total population of 10,109.

References

Wards of Meru District
Wards of Arusha Region